The 2023 season is Hammarby Fotboll's 108th in existence, their 54th season in Allsvenskan and their 9th consecutive season in the league. They compete in Allsvenskan and Svenska Cupen and the UEFA Europa Conference League. League play will start in April and end in November. Martí Cifuentes makes his second season as head coach.

Summary

Players

Squad information

Transfers

In

Out

Player statistics

Appearances and goals

|-
! colspan=12 style=background:#DCDCDC; text-align:center| Goalkeepers

|-
! colspan=12 style=background:#DCDCDC; text-align:center| Defenders

|-
! colspan=12 style=background:#DCDCDC; text-align:center| Midfielders

|-
! colspan=12 style=background:#DCDCDC; text-align:center| Forwards

|-

Club

Coaching staff

Technical staff

Other information

Pre-season and friendlies

Friendlies

Competitions

Allsvenskan

League table

Results summary

Results by round

Matches
Kickoff times are in (UTC+01) unless stated otherwise.

Svenska Cupen

2022–23
The tournament continued from the 2022 season.

Kickoff times are in UTC+1.

Group 3

Knockout stage

Footnotes

References

Hammarby Fotboll seasons
Hammarby Fotboll